The 1925–26 British Home Championship was an international football tournament played during the 1925–26 season between the British Home Nations. The competition was won at a canter by Scotland, who whitewashed all three opponents, scoring eight goals in three games without reply.

Scotland began to competition as they finished it, with a 3–0 defeat of Wales in Cardiff as England and Ireland played a tame scoreless draw as the tournament opener. Ireland improved from their poor first match performance against Wales in their second game, running out 3–0 winners to move into second place, but were hammered 4–0 by Scotland in their final game, ending any hopes of a winner's place; Hughie Gallacher scored three of Scotland's goals. England returned for the final two matches of the competition, but suffered disaster and crashed to last place as Wales won 3–1 in London and Scotland, already assured the title whatever the result, beat them by a single goal.

Table

Results

Winning squad

References 

1925–26 in English football
1925–26 in Scottish football
Brit
1926 in British sport
1925-26
1925 in British sport
1925–26 in Northern Ireland association football